Leonard Kamsler (October 18, 1935 – November 18, 2020) was an American golf photojournalist. He received the Lifetime Achievement Award in Photojournalism from the Professional Golfers' Association of America in 2020.

References

1935 births
2020 deaths
People from Bethel, New York
Duke University alumni
American photojournalists
Photographers from New York (state)
20th-century American photographers
21st-century American photographers